Tarabulus Zoo Park is a park in Tripoli, Libya, located to the south of Tripoli city center. Tripoli Zoo is in the south-west corner of the park, and the Rixos Al Nasr hotel is situated in its south-east corner.

Colonel Gaddafi's Bab al-Azizia complex is situated immediately to the north-east of the park.

References

Parks in Libya
Buildings and structures in Tripoli, Libya
Neighborhoods of Tripoli, Libya